Eknomiaster is a genus of echinoderms belonging to the family Goniasteridae.

The species of this genus are found in Australia and Madagascar.

Species:

Eknomiaster beccae 
Eknomiaster horologium 
Eknomiaster macauleyensis

References

Goniasteridae
Asteroidea genera